Ouled Hamla is a town located in Aïn M'Lila District, Oum El Bouaghi Province, Algeria.

Bordered on the north-west by the municipality of Teleghma (Mila Province), the commune Souk Naamane to the south-west, the municipality of El Khroub (Constantine Province) to the north-east, and by Aïn M'lila to the south-east. The commune of Ouled Hamla covers an area of 152 km2. The population is estimated at 11,546 inhabitants, or a density of 75.96 inhabitants per km2.

The main crops have been maintained over the centuries, including cereals such as wheat and barley. Other important agricultural products include potatoes, tomatoes, peppers, carrots, and other vegetables.

Etymology 
From about 1830 to 1962, the name of Ouled Hamla was Bertaux, after the name of a French colonel who lived there during the French colonization.

The word  means 'sons of' in Maghrebi Arabic.

Communes of Oum El Bouaghi Province
Cities in Algeria
Algeria